Sinice of Reims or Saint Sinice was a 3rd-century French saint and Bishop of Soissons.

As a priest, Sinice evangelized the regions of Soissons and Reims in the company of Sixtus of Reims, who appointed him Bishop of Soissons. Sinice was Bishop of Reims following Sixtus, a position he held from  280 until 286 AD.

He was originally buried with Sixtus but was transferred in the 10th century, to the Church Saint-Rémi de Reims.
His Feast day is on 1 September in the company of Nivard and Sixtus.

References

Year of birth unknown
Bishops of Soissons
3rd-century Christian saints